Alston's cotton rat (Sigmodon alstoni) is a rodent species from South America. It is found in Brazil, Colombia, Guyana, Suriname, and Venezuela, where it inhabits lowland savannas.

References

Cotton rats
Mammals of Colombia
Mammals described in 1881
Taxa named by Oldfield Thomas